The 2012 Liga Nacional Menores de Voleibol Femenino (Spanish for: 2012 Girls' Youth National Volleyball League) or 2012 LNMVF is the 1st edition of the Peruvian Volleyball League in the youth category (U17). The competition is open for all 12 teams who have the A1 category in the LNSV, for this season 11 out of the 12 teams signed up. Teams were made up of U17 players.

Competing Teams
Teams were seeded according to how they finished in the 2012 Junior Edition.

Competition format
The competition is divided in two phases, the group round in which teams are divided into two groups and they will play once against the other teams in the same pool, after the first round is finished, the top three teams will move on to the next round. The final round is a single round-robyn with all six teams playing one against the other 5, including the teams that had already played each other in the group round, the top team ranking wise will be named champion.

First round

Pool A

|}

|}

Pool B

|}

|}

Final round

Final ranking

|}

Matches

|}

Final Standing

Individual awards

Most Valuable Player
Hilary Palma (Sporting Cristal)
Best Scorer
Hilary Palma (Sporting Cristal)
Best Spiker
Hilary Palma (Sporting Cristal)
Best Blocker
Nair Canessa (Géminis)
Best Server
Xiomara Mariche (Géminis)

Best Digger
Hannah Sobrado (Túpac Amaru)
Best Setter
Carol García (Túpac Amaru)
Best Receiver
Alyson Lora (Géminis)
Best Libero
Hannah Sobrado (Túpac Amaru)

References

External links
LNSV
Voleibol.pe

Volleyball competitions in Peru
2013 in Peruvian sport